Bersenbrück is a Samtgemeinde ("collective municipality") in the district of Osnabrück, in Lower Saxony, Germany. Its seat is in the town Bersenbrück.

The Samtgemeinde Bersenbrück consists of the following municipalities:

 Alfhausen 
 Ankum
 Bersenbrück
 Eggermühlen
 Gehrde
 Kettenkamp
 Rieste

References